Ariel Armony is an Argentinian academic and the current vice provost for global affairs at the University of Pittsburgh. Armony is the author of numerous books on political science and Latin American studies. Armony has led University of Pittsburgh's international programs since he was named the senior director of international programs and director of the University Center for International Studies in 2014.

Early life
Armony was born and raised in Buenos Aires. He was 14 when a military coup started the junta known as the National Reorganization Process. He attended the University of Buenos Aires in the 1980s, working as a journalist and as a director and actor for a theatre company. He traveled to the United States to study for his master's degree in international affairs at Ohio University, and stayed in the U.S. to earn his PhD in political science from the University of Pittsburgh.

Career

Armony began to trace the role of the Argentine military in their support of counter-revolutionary movements throughout Latin America, which led to his book Argentina, the United States, and the Anti-Communist Crusade in Latin America (Ohio, 1997). The book was translated into Spanish and published by the Universidad de Quilmes in Argentina.

After serving first as professor and then as director of Latin American Studies at Colby College, Dr. Armony accepted a Fulbright scholarship to teach at Nankai University. Much of his subsequent work has focused on the role of China in Latin America. He also wrote The Dubious Link: Civic Engagement and Democratization (Stanford, 2004), which made the University Press Bestsellers List. His work has been published in a number of academic journals in the United States, Mexico, Colombia, Argentina, and China.

Prior to moving to Pittsburgh, Dr. Armony was director of the University of Miami's Center for Latin American Studies, a position he held for four years. His research has been supported by the Rockefeller Foundation, Mellon Foundation, Kellogg Foundation, the International Development Research Centre, the Inter-American Foundation, and the International Labour Organization, among others. In addition to his academic appointments, Dr. Armony has served as a consultant for the US State Department, Argentina's Foreign Affairs Ministry, and Honduras’ National Commissioner for Human Rights.

Selected works
The Global Edge: Miami in the Twenty-First Century, University of California Press, 2018, 
The Dubious Link, Stanford University Press, 2004, 
Argentina, the United States, and the Anti-Communist Crusade in Central America, 1977-1984, Ohio University Press, 1997,

References

External links
Faculty profile, University of Pittsburgh

University of Pittsburgh alumni
University of Pittsburgh people
Argentine political scientists
Living people
Ohio University alumni
1961 births